Thomas John Ley (28 October 188024 July 1947) was an Australian politician who was convicted of murder in England. He is widely suspected to have been involved in the deaths of a number of people in Australia, including political rivals.

Early life
Ley was born on 28 October 1880 in Bath, Somerset, England, one of four children born to  Elizabeth (née Bryant) and Henry Ley. His father, who worked as a butler, died in 1882.

In 1886, Ley's mother moved the family to Australia along with his maternal grandmother. They settled in Sydney, where he attended Crown Street Public School until the age of 10. He began working as a young boy, initially as a paper-boy and messenger, then later as an assistant in his mother's grocery store and as a farm labourer at Windsor. Ley learned shorthand while living in Windsor and at the age of fourteen secured a position as a junior clerk and stenographer with a solicitor on Pitt Street. He joined the office of Norton, Smith & Co. in 1901 and in 1906 became an articled clerk. He was admitted as a solicitor in 1914.

Ley married Emily Louisa (known as "Lewie") Vernon in 1898, the year she emigrated to Australia from England. Both husband and wife were active in politics: she in the international suffrage movement, and he as a state and federal politician from 1917 to 1928.

State politics 

Ley served in the lower house of the New South Wales parliament (1917–25) as member for Hurstville from 1917 to 1920, representing the Nationalist Party, and St George from 1920 to 1925, representing the Progressive Party until 1922. He was a prominent and vocal advocate of proportional representation, which the state adopted in 1919. Both of his electorates were in Sydney's southern suburbs.

As a teetotaler, Ley acquired the nickname "Lemonade Ley", but the temperance movement accused him of betrayal when he supported legislation which eased requirements for the sale of alcohol. It later emerged that Ley was being paid by the brewery lobby. Despite this, he was appointed as New South Wales Minister for Justice from 1922 to 1925 – in the cabinet of Premier Sir George Fuller – and gained a reputation for harsh decisions.

Shortly after he became Minister for Justice, Ley made an official visit to Western Australia and was introduced to Maggie Evelyn Brook, a magistrate's wife. Shortly afterwards the magistrate died; Ley acted for her and her daughter in various financial and legal matters.

Federal politician 

In 1925, Ley stood for the seat of Barton in the federal House of Representatives. He unsuccessfully tried to bribe his Labor opponent, Frederick McDonald, with a £2,000 share in a property at Kings Cross in return for withdrawing from the ballot. McDonald instead publicly revealed the attempted bribe. Despite that, Ley won the election on a large swing as part of the decisive Coalition victory that year.

Conventional wisdom would have suggested that Ley, as a former senior member of the New South Wales government, would have been considered for a post in the federal cabinet. However, Ley's fellow conservatives, including Prime Minister Stanley Bruce, began to have doubts about him after the election. As a result, Ley was not considered for ministerial preferment.

McDonald took the matter of the bribe to court, but disappeared in mysterious circumstances. The case against Ley collapsed for lack of evidence when McDonald failed to appear. While the disappearance may have been a coincidence, later events put the matter in a more sinister light. In 1928, state legislator Hyman Goldstein, another of Ley's public critics, was found dead after apparently falling from "Suicide Point" on the cliffs of Coogee. Then a group of businessmen, concerned at Ley's reputation for dubious business dealings, appointed Keith Greedor, a former Ley associate turned opponent, to investigate. Travelling to Newcastle by boat, Greedor fell overboard and drowned.

Return to England 
After his defeat in the 1928 election, Ley returned to England with Brook, leaving his wife in Australia. Little is recorded of Ley's life during the 1930s. About all that can be said for certain is that he used his move to England to start afresh in dubious business ventures, and during the Second World War he was arrested and convicted for black marketeering.

The Chalk-pit Murder
In 1946, Brook was living in Wimbledon, and Ley had his house at 5 Beaufort Gardens, London, converted into flats. Ley falsely believed that Brook and a barman called John McMain Mudie were having an affair. Ley persuaded two of his labourers that Mudie was a blackmailer, and together they tortured and killed him. The case became known as the "Chalk-pit Murder" because Mudie's body was dumped in a chalk pit on Woldingham Common in Surrey, thirty miles away from Ley's home.

With Lawrence John Smith, Ley was tried at the Old Bailey; both were sentenced to death in March 1947. However, both Smith and Ley escaped the noose: Smith's sentence was commuted to life imprisonment, while Ley was declared insane and sent to Broadmoor Asylum for the Criminally Insane. He died there soon after of a cerebral haemorrhage. He is said to have been the wealthiest person ever to be imprisoned at Broadmoor. He left an estate in New South Wales valued for probate at £744.

Ley's wife had followed him to England in 1942. From Broadmoor, Ley wrote letters and poems, and protested his innocence to his wife and children. After his death, his widow returned to Australia. She died at Bowral, New South Wales in 1956.

External links
 Minister for Murder ABC TV – partial transcript of documentary recounting Ley's career (2004)

References

 Morgan, Dan (1979). The Minister for Murder. Richmond, Victoria: Hutchinson of Australia.  
 F. Tennyson Jesse, "Ley and Smith", in James H. Hodge (ed.) (1954). Famous Trials 4. Penguin Books, pp. 105–142

|-

1880 births
1946 murders in the United Kingdom
1947 deaths
20th-century Australian politicians
Australian people convicted of murder
Australian people imprisoned abroad
Australian politicians convicted of crimes
Australian prisoners sentenced to death
English emigrants to Australia
Members of the Australian House of Representatives for Barton
Members of the New South Wales Legislative Assembly
Nationalist Party of Australia members of the Parliament of Australia
Nationalist Party of Australia members of the Parliament of New South Wales
People acquitted by reason of insanity
People convicted of murder by England and Wales
People detained at Broadmoor Hospital
People from Bath, Somerset
Politicians convicted of murder
Prisoners sentenced to death by England and Wales
Prisoners who died in England and Wales detention
Suspected serial killers